Countess of Clarendon is a title given to the wife of the Earl of Clarendon. Women who have held the title include:

Frances Hyde, Countess of Clarendon (1617-1667)
Flower Backhouse, Countess of Clarendon (died 1700)
Jane Hyde, Countess of Clarendon (1669-1725)
Charlotte Villiers, Countess of Clarendon (1721-1790)
Maria Villiers, Countess of Clarendon (1761-1844)